For the black settlement in Florida see Freemanville, Florida

Freemanville is an unincorporated community in Escambia County, Alabama, United States, near Atmore.

References

Unincorporated communities in Alabama
Unincorporated communities in Escambia County, Alabama